The 1960 VFL Grand Final was an Australian rules football game between the Melbourne Football Club and Collingwood Football Club, held at the Melbourne Cricket Ground in Melbourne on 24 September 1960.

Collingwood's score stands as the lowest it has kicked since the sixth round of 1900, and its sixth-lowest ever. Their four scoring shots is the second-lowest by any team since the tenth round of 1908, with only Fitzroy against Footscray in 1953 having fewer. Even the two goals the Magpies did score were regarded as very lucky. One was from a long kick that just made the distance, and the other was after an easy mark by Melbourne full back Tassie Johnson was dropped in the goal square.

This was Melbourne's seventh premiership appearance in successive seasons, having won all these contests except the 1954 VFL Grand Final and 1958 VFL Grand Final.

Teams

{|
|valign="top"|

Umpire: Jack Irving

Scoreboard

Statistics

Goalkickers

References
AFL Tables: 1960 Grand Final
 The Official statistical history of the AFL 2004
 Ross, J. (ed), 100 Years of Australian Football 1897-1996: The Complete Story of the AFL, All the Big Stories, All the Great Pictures, All the Champions, Every AFL Season Reported, Viking, (Ringwood), 1996.

See also
 1960 VFL season

VFL/AFL Grand Finals
Vfl Grand Final, 1960
Melbourne Football Club
Collingwood Football Club